Mark Lloyd Bruyns (born 8 November 1973, in Pietermaritzburg) is a former South African first class cricketer for Natal, Border and the Warriors. A right-handed batsman, he played between 1993–94 and 2005–06. He occasionally kept wicket.

References
 

1973 births
Living people
KwaZulu-Natal cricketers
South African cricketers
Border cricketers
Warriors cricketers
Alumni of Maritzburg College